The Takamanda National Park is a protected area in Cameroon, set up in 2008 to help protect the endangered Cross River gorilla.

An older protected area, the Takamanda Forest Reserve, was established in 1934 and covered an area of 675.99 km.

There are about 43 villages in the park and in 2000 about 16,000 people lived in them.

The park is characterized by great biodiversity, in which various animals live, in addition to several species of monkeys, there are wild pigs, small antelopes and many species of birds.

References

Protected areas established in 1934
National parks of Cameroon